Capital Radio Network is an Australian radio company, which owns stations in Canberra, Goulburn, Cooma, the Snowy Mountains, Gippsland and Perth. The company is a subsidiary of Blyton Group, with Kevin James Blyton as managing director for both. The company first acquired 2XL (now XLFM) in the Snowy Mountains, as well as 2CC and 2CA in Canberra - the latter two offloaded from parent companies Australian Radio Network and Austereo respectively in order for them to launch joint-venture stations 104.7 and Mix 106.3.

In February 2015, Capital Radio Network acquired Gippsland-based 3GG.

With the exception of XLFM, Snow FM and 3GG, all stations are operated as a 50/50 joint-venture with Grant Broadcasters.

Owned and Operated Stations

Canberra
2CC Talking Canberra 1206 2CC - 1206AM and DAB+ 2cc.net.au
2CA Forever Classic 2CA  - 1053 AM and DAB+
KIX Country Radio 97.5FM and DAB+
My Canberra Digital DAB+
Snow FM, relayed on DAB+
Cooma/Jindabyne/Snowy Mountains
XLFM 
96.1FM Cooma
107.3FM Jindabyne 
98.7FM Perisher Valley
92.1FM Thredbo
92.5FM Bombala
92.5FM Charlotte Pass
Snow FM 
97.7 FM,  Cooma
94.7FM Jindabyne 
101.9FM Perisher 
92.9FM Thredbo
91.7FM Bombala 
91.7FM Charlotte Pass
DAB+ Canberra
KIX Country Radio - Cooma 87.6FM, Jindabyne 88.0FM
Gippsland
3GG 531 AM
Goulburn
GNFM 107.7 FM
Eagle FM 93.5 FM
KIX Country Radio 100.7FM
Perth
6iX 1080 AM, 105.7FM & DAB+
KIX Country Radio DAB+
My Perth Digital DAB+
X Digital DAB+

Networks 
Some Capital Radio Network stations broadcast identical formats and programming in the networks below:

Former Stations 
In the 1990s, Kevin Blyton held a 40% stake in Newcastle's NXFM.

Outside of buying and selling stations in the same stations/territories as current stations, he has also held stations in Tasmania and Queenstown, New Zealand.

Notes

References

External links 
 2CC
 2CA
 2GN
 
3GG
EagleFM
 XLFM
 SnowFM
 6iX
 My Perth Digital
 My Canberra Digital
 X Digital

 
Australian radio networks